Major Ebden Memorial Cricket Tournament is a cricket competition in Visakhapatnam, Andhra Pradesh, India. It was started in 1941 in honour of Major John A. W. Ebden, professor of Surgery and the Principal of Andhra Medical College.

References
Major Ebden Memorial Cricket Tournament (AMC)- A Forerunner of Cricket Activity in Coastal Andhra, article written by Dr. R. Ahikrishna, former principal in AMC Alumni Global Meet Souvenair, 2008.

Indian domestic cricket competitions
Recurring sporting events established in 1941
Sport in Visakhapatnam
Cricket in Andhra Pradesh